Harry Howell may refer to:

Harry Howell (cricketer) (1890–1932), English cricketer and footballer
Harry Howell (ice hockey) (1932–2019), Canadian hockey player
Harry Howell (baseball) (1876–1956), American baseball player

See also 
Henry Howell (disambiguation)